Darryl C. Towns (born July 21, 1961) was the Commissioner and CEO of New York State Homes and Community Renewal agency. He is a former representative of the 54th Assembly District in the New York State Legislature, which comprises the Brooklyn neighborhoods of Bushwick, Cypress Hills, and East New York from 1993 to 2011.

Career
Towns won the seat in the New York Assembly in September 1992, defeating 10-year incumbent Thomas Catapano.

In 1994 Towns was appointed Chairman of the Subcommittee on Mass Transit by Assembly Speaker Sheldon Silver.

From 1981 to 1986, Towns served in the United States Air Force.

Prior to his election to office, Towns also served as Director of Community Affairs at Interfaith Hospital.

In January 2007, Towns was elected chair of the State Legislature's Black, Puerto Rican, Hispanic & Asian Legislative Caucus.

In 2011, Towns vacated his Assembly seat to become Commissioner and CEO of the New York State Homes and Community Renewal agency when appointed by Governor Andrew Cuomo.

Personal life

Towns is the son of former Congressman Edolphus Towns, who formerly represented the 11th and 10th Districts in Brooklyn's congressional delegation.

He is married to Karen Boykin-Towns, Senior Counselor at Sard Verbinnen & Co., a global strategic communications consultancy.  They have two daughters.

He is a graduate of North Carolina Agricultural and Technical State University with a degree in economics.

2011 DWI
Towns crashed his automobile and damaged the front end driving off a highway ramp in Westchester County, New York and was arrested by the police for driving while intoxicated early in the morning on July 3, 2011. He was not injured. On September 19, 2011, Towns pleaded guilty to misdemeanor drunk driving charge and has to pay a nearly $900 fine, his driver's license was revoked, and has to complete two alcohol-abuse treatment programs.

References

External links
Weddings; Darryl Towns and Karen Boykin
Assemblyman Daryl Towns Profile from the New York State Democratic Committee.

1961 births
Living people
African-American state legislators in New York (state)
Democratic Party members of the New York State Assembly
United States Air Force airmen
21st-century American politicians
21st-century African-American politicians
20th-century African-American people